Reba Live is a live album by American country singer Reba McEntire released on August 30, 1989. It is Reba's only live album to date.  It features material primarily from her MCA recordings, including several covers ("Respect", "Jolene", "Mama Tried", "Night Life" and "Sweet Dreams").  The album had no singles.  It won the Favorite Country Album award at the American Music Awards.

Track listing

Personnel 
 Reba McEntire – lead vocals
 Kirk Cappello – keyboards, backing vocals
 Michael Thomas – electric guitars
 Glen Duncan – acoustic guitar, fiddle, mandolin, backing vocals
Joe McGlohon – acoustic guitar, saxophone
 ? – banjo on "Jolene"
 Steve Marshall – bass guitar
 Vic Mastrianni – drums
 Suzy Wills – backing vocals

Production 
 Jimmy Bowen – producer 
 Reba McEntire – producer
 Kirk Cappello – assistant producer
 Bill "Dog" Dooley – recording engineer 
 Gary Long – recording engineer
 Tim McColm – recording engineer
 Brently Walton – recording engineer
 Bob Bullock – overdub recording, mixing, digital editing
 Dave Boyer – assistant engineer
 Mark J. Coddington – assistant engineer
 Julian King – assistant engineer 
 Russ Martin – assistant engineer
 Marty Williams – assistant engineer
 Milan Bogdan – digital editing
 Glenn Meadows – mastering 
 Mark Eshelman – project coordinator 
 Jessie Noble – project coordinator 
 Mickey Braithwaite – art direction, design 
 Beth Gwinn – photography

Charts

Weekly charts

Year-end charts

Certifications and sales

References

Reba McEntire albums
Albums produced by Jimmy Bowen
1989 live albums
MCA Records live albums